Samuel Heath Jaeger (born January 29, 1977) is an American actor and screenwriter.

Life and career
Jaeger was born in Perrysburg, Ohio, the son of LeAnne (née Graening) and Charles Jaeger. He is the youngest of four children. He graduated from Perrysburg High School in 1995 and in 1999, he received a Bachelor of Fine Arts Degree at Otterbein College. Following his graduation, Jaeger worked in a casting office in New York. He married actress Amber Marie Mellott whom he met at Otterbein College, on August 25, 2007. He has four children, August, born in 2010, Redford, born ca. 2014, Calvin, born June 26, 2016, and stepdaughter, Aubrey.

Jaeger started his acting career while still in college, with a small guest role in New York-based TV series Law & Order (1990). He also acted on several theater stages in New York before moving to Los Angeles and Hollywood to act in full-length movies. His career gained speed when he managed to get roles in well-known feature films as Traffic (2000) and Behind Enemy Lines (2001). After that he appeared alongside Bruce Willis and Colin Farrell in Hart's War (2002) as Captain R. G. Sisk. In 2009, Jaeger landed the role of Joel Graham in NBC's television series Parenthood, which premiered in 2010. Additionally, he wrote, directed, and starred with his wife in the 2011 film Take Me Home.

Jaeger's television appearances include the role of Richard on ABC's When We Rise, the role of Tim Powell on Tell Me a Story, and the role of Rob Stanton on Why Women Kill. He is currently a reoccurring character, Mark Tuello, in Hulu's The Handmaid's Tale.

Filmography

Film

Television

Music videos

References

External links

1977 births
20th-century American male actors
21st-century American male actors
Living people
American male film actors
American male television actors
Male actors from Ohio
Otterbein University alumni
People from Perrysburg, Ohio
American male screenwriters
Film directors from Ohio
Screenwriters from Ohio